Where Are We Going, Dad? may refer to:
 Where Are We Going, Dad? (TV series)
 Where Are We Going, Dad? (film)
 Where Are We Going, Dad? 2, 2015 sequel to the first film

See also
Dad! Where Are We Going?, South Korean TV series  on which the Chinese show is based